Euophrys is a genus of jumping spiders that was first described by Carl Ludwig Koch in 1834. The small black E. omnisuperstes lives on Mount Everest at elevations up to 6,700 meters, possibly making it the most elevated animal in the world.

Species
 it contains 108 species and one subspecies, found in Oceania, North America, Africa, Europe, Asia, Central America, South America, and on the Windward Islands:
E. acripes (Simon, 1871) – France (Corsica)
E. alabardata Caporiacco, 1947 – Ethiopia
E. albimana Denis, 1937 – Algeria
E. albopatella Petrunkevitch, 1914 – Myanmar
E. altera (Simon, 1868) – Spain
E. alticola Denis, 1955 – France, Spain
E. arenaria (Urquhart, 1888) – New Zealand
E. astuta (Simon, 1871) – Morocco
E. auricolor Dyal, 1935 – Pakistan
E. baliola (Simon, 1871) – France (Corsica)
E. banksi Roewer, 1951 – Mexico
E. bifida Wesolowska, Azarkina & Russell-Smith, 2014 – South Africa
E. bifoveolata Tullgren, 1905 – Argentina
E. bryophila Berry, Beatty & Prószyński, 1996 – Fiji
E. canariensis Denis, 1941 – Canary Is.
E. capicola Simon, 1901 – South Africa
E. catherinae Prószyński, 2000 – Egypt
E. cochlea Wesolowska, Azarkina & Russell-Smith, 2014 – South Africa
E. concolorata Roewer, 1951 – Pakistan (Karakorum)
E. convergentis Strand, 1906 – Algeria, Tunisia, Libya
E. cooki Zabka, 1985 – Vietnam
E. crux Taczanowski, 1878 – Peru
E. declivis Karsch, 1879 – Sri Lanka
E. dhaulagirica Zabka, 1980 – Nepal
E. difficilis (Simon, 1868) – Southern Europe
E. elizabethae Wesolowska, Azarkina & Russell-Smith, 2014 – South Africa
E. evae Zabka, 1981 – India (Kashmir)
E. everestensis Wanless, 1975 – China (Tibet)
E. falciger Wesolowska, Azarkina & Russell-Smith, 2014 – South Africa
E. ferrumequinum Taczanowski, 1878 – Ecuador, Peru
E. flavoatra (Grube, 1861) – Russia (Urals to Far East)
E. frontalis (Walckenaer, 1802) (type) – Europe, Turkey, Caucasus, Russia (Europe to Far East), Central Asia, India, China, Korea, Japan
E. fucata (Simon, 1868) – Turkey
E. gambosa (Simon, 1868) – Mediterranean
Euophrys g. mediocris Simon, 1937 – Southern Europe
E. gracilis Wesolowska, Azarkina & Russell-Smith, 2014 – South Africa, Lesotho
E. granulata Denis, 1947 – Egypt
E. griswoldi Wesolowska, Azarkina & Russell-Smith, 2014 – Namibia
E. heliophaniformis Dönitz & Strand, 1906 – Japan
E. herbigrada (Simon, 1871) – Western, Central, Southern Europe
E. innotata (Simon, 1868) – Western Mediterranean
E. jirica Zabka, 1980 – Nepal
E. kataokai Ikeda, 1996 – Russia (Far East), Korea, China, Japan
E. kawkaban Wesolowska & van Harten, 2007 – Yemen
E. kirghizica Logunov, 1997 – Kyrgyzstan
E. kororensis Berry, Beatty & Prószyński, 1996 – Caroline Is.
E. leipoldti Peckham & Peckham, 1903 – South Africa
E. leucopalpis Taczanowski, 1878 – Peru
E. leucostigma C. L. Koch, 1846 – Brazil
E. limpopo Wesolowska, Azarkina & Russell-Smith, 2014 – South Africa
E. littoralis Soyer, 1959 – France
E. longyangensis Lei & Peng, 2012 – China
E. lunata Bertkau, 1880 – Brazil
E. luteolineata (Simon, 1871) – France (Corsica)
E. manicata (Simon, 1871) – Morocco
E. marmarica Caporiacco, 1928 – Libya
E. maseruensis Wesolowska, Azarkina & Russell-Smith, 2014 – Lesotho
E. maura Taczanowski, 1878 – Peru
E. megastyla Caporiacco, 1949 – Kenya
E. melanoleuca Mello-Leitão, 1944 – Argentina
E. menemerella Strand, 1909 – South Africa
E. meridionalis Wesolowska, Azarkina & Russell-Smith, 2014 – South Africa
E. miranda Wesolowska, Azarkina & Russell-Smith, 2014 – South Africa
E. monadnock Emerton, 1891 – USA, Canada
E. namulinensis Hu, 2001 – China
E. nana Wesolowska, Azarkina & Russell-Smith, 2014 – South Africa
E. nanchonensis Taczanowski, 1878 – Peru
E. nangqianensis Hu, 2001 – China
E. nepalica Zabka, 1980 – Nepal, China
E. newtoni Peckham & Peckham, 1896 – Central America
E. nigripalpis Simon, 1937 – Portugal, Spain, France (incl. Corsica)
E. nigritarsis (Simon, 1868) – France
E. nigromaculata (Lucas, 1846) – Algeria
E. omnisuperstes Wanless, 1975 – Nepal, India?
E. patellaris Denis, 1957 – Spain
E. pelzelni Taczanowski, 1878 – Peru
E. peruviana Taczanowski, 1878 – Peru
E. petrensis C. L. Koch, 1837 – Europe to Central Asia
E. pexa Simon, 1937 – France
E. proszynskii Logunov, Cutler & Marusik, 1993 – Russia (Central Asia to Far East), Kazakhstan
E. pseudogambosa Strand, 1915 – Turkey, Israel
E. pulchella Peckham & Peckham, 1894 – St. Vincent
E. purcelli Peckham & Peckham, 1903 – South Africa
E. quadricolor Taczanowski, 1878 – Peru
E. quadripunctata (Lucas, 1846) – Algeria
E. recta Wesolowska, Azarkina & Russell-Smith, 2014 – South Africa
E. robusta Lei & Peng, 2012 – China
E. rubroclypea Dyal, 1935 – Pakistan
E. rufa Dyal, 1935 – Pakistan
E. rufibarbis (Simon, 1868) – Southern Europe, North Africa, Turkey, China
E. rufimana (Simon, 1875) – France
E. sanctimatei Taczanowski, 1878 – Peru
E. sedula (Simon, 1875) – France
E. semirufa Simon, 1884 – Syria
E. sima Chamberlin, 1916 – Peru
E. sinapicolor Taczanowski, 1878 – Peru
E. subtilis Wesolowska, Azarkina & Russell-Smith, 2014 – South Africa
E. sulphurea (L. Koch, 1867) – Southern Europe, Turkey, Syria
E. tengchongensis Lei & Peng, 2012 – China
E. terrestris (Simon, 1871) – Southern Europe
E. testaceozonata Caporiacco, 1922 – Italy
E. turkmenica Logunov, 1997 – Turkmenistan
E. uphami (Peckham & Peckham, 1903) – South Africa
E. uralensis Logunov, Cutler & Marusik, 1993 – Russia (Europe) to Central Asia
E. valens Bösenberg & Lenz, 1895 – East Africa
E. wanyan Berry, Beatty & Prószyński, 1996 – Caroline Is.
E. wenxianensis Yang & Tang, 1997 – China
E. ysobolii Peckham & Peckham, 1896 – Guatemala
E. yulungensis Zabka, 1980 – China, Nepal

References

External links
Photograph of E. frontalis
Photograph of E. herbigrada
Photograph of E. rufibarbis
Photograph of E. sulfurea

Cosmopolitan spiders
Salticidae
Salticidae genera
Taxa named by Carl Ludwig Koch